Phryne was a famous courtesan of Ancient Greece. Sometimes also Phryné in English.

Phryne may also refer to:
 Phryné (opera)
 1291 Phryne, a main-belt asteroid
 Phryne Fisher, a fictional detective
 Phyrne , synonym for Sisymbrium